Nuvedi may refer to:
Nüvədi, Azerbaijan
Nuvedi, Iran
Nüvədi, Lankaran (disambiguation)